Presidency College is a autonomous private professional college in Bangalore, India. It was founded by The Presidency Group of Institutions. The Presidency Group was established in the year 1976 and today it consists of seven schools, two colleges and one university, and has been established for three decades. It is an NIRF Ranked College in 2017, was re-accredited by NAAC with 'A+', and affiliated to Bengaluru City University and approved by AICTE, New Delhi.

Courses offered

Under graduate
 Bachelor of Arts (Journalism)
 Bachelor of Computer Application (BCA)
 Bachelor of Commerce (B. Com)
 Bachelor of Business Administration (BBA)

Post graduate
 Master of Commerce (M. Com)
 Master of Commerce in Finance & Accounting  (M. Com FA)
 Master in Business Administration (MBA)
Master of Computer Applications(MCA)
 PhD - Management

References

External links

Colleges in Bangalore
Colleges in India